Vincent Zhan Silu (born March 13, 1961) is the current Roman Catholic bishop of the archdiocese of Funing.

Biography

Zhiu was consecrated priest on June 24, 1989 and bishop on January 6, 2000 serving as auxiliary bishop of Funing without papal permission being excommunicated latae sententiae and had been serving as bishop of Funing since August 5, 2005.

On September 22, 2018, Pope Francis lifted the excommunication of Zhan Silu and other six bishops previously appointed by the Chinese government without a pontifical mandate.

See also

Joseph Ma Yinglin
Joseph Liu Xinhong
Bernardine Dong Guangqing

Sources

Asianews.it
BBC

References

External links
 http://www.catholic-hierarchy.org/bishop/bzhansilu.html

1961 births
Living people
21st-century Roman Catholic bishops in China
People temporarily excommunicated by the Catholic Church
Bishops of the Catholic Patriotic Association